Types of mill include the following:

Manufacturing facilities

Categorized by power source
 Watermill, a mill powered by moving water
 Windmill, a mill powered by moving air (wind)
 Tide mill, a water mill that uses the tide's movement
 Treadmill or treadwheel, a mill powered by human or animal movement
 Horse mill, a mill powered by horses' movement

Categorized by not being a fixed building
 Ship mill, a water mill that floats on the river or bay whose current or tide provides the water movement
 Field mill (carriage), a portable mill

Categorized by what is made and/or acted on
 Rice mill, processes paddy to rice
 Bark mill, produces tanbark for tanneries
 Coffee mill
 Colloid mill
 Cider mill, crushes apples to give cider
Flotation mill, in mining, uses grinding and froth flotation to concentrate ores using differences in materials' hydrophobicity
 Gristmill, a grain mill (flour mill)
 Herb grinder
 Oil mill, see expeller pressing, extrusion
 Ore mill, for crushing and processing ore
 Paper mill
 Pellet mill
 Powder mill, produces gunpowder
 Puppy mill, a breeding facility that produces puppies on a large scale, where the welfare of the dogs is jeopardized for profits
 Rock crusher
 Sugar cane mill
 Sawmill, a lumber mill
 starch mill
 Steel mill
 sugar mill (also called a sugar refinery), processes sugar beets or sugar cane into various finished products
 Textile mills for textile manufacturing:
 Cotton mill
 Flax mill, for flax
 Silk mill, for silk
 woollen mill, see textile manufacturing
 huller (also called a rice mill, or rice husker) is used to hull rice
 Wire mill, for wire drawing
Ka mill - Sandy mill

Other types
 See :Category:Industrial buildings

Industrial tools for size reduction and/or filtration
(See comminution, filtration)
 Arrastra, simple mill for grinding and pulverizing (typically) gold or silver ore
 Ball mill, a mill using balls to crush the material
 Bead mill a type of Mill (grinding)
 Burr mill or burr grinder, a mill using burrs to crush the material, usually manufactured for a single purpose such as coffee beans, dried peppercorns, coarse salt, spices, or poppy seeds
 Coffee grinder
 Conical mill (or conical screen mill)
 Cutting mill, a device commonly used in laboratories for the preliminary size reduction of materials
 Disc mill (or disk mill)
 Edge mill
 End mill, a type of milling cutter used in milling in the machining sense
 Expeller pressing (also called oil pressing)
 Hammermill, a mill using little hammers to crush the material
 IsaMill, an energy-efficient mineral industry grinding mill that was jointly developed in the 1990s by Mount Isa Mines
 Jet mill, grinds materials by using a high speed jet of compressed air or inert gas to impact particles into each other.
 Milling machine, a machine tool that performs milling (machining)
 Mortar and pestle
 Pin mill, a mill for achieving very fine particle sizes
 Planetary mill
 Roller mill, a mill using rollers to grind or pulverize grain and other raw materials using cylinders
 Rolling mill, for rolling (metalworking)
 Strip mill, a type of rolling mill
 Slitting mill, for slitting metal into nails
 VSI mill, a mill with a vertical shaft that spins
 Stamp mill, a specialized machine for reducing ore to powder for further processing or for fracturing other materials
 Three roll mill
 Ultrasonic disintegrator a type of Mill (grinding)
 Vibratory mill a type of Mill (grinding)
 VSI mill (vertical shaft impactor mill), a mill that comminutes particles of material into smaller (finer) particles by throwing them against a hard surface inside the mill
 A wet mill performs wet-milling: steeps a substance in water to remove specific compounds
 Wiley mill, a specific group of grinding mills manufactured under the name Thomas Scientific

Lists of agricultural buildings
Lists of industrial buildings
!